José María Cruz Novillo (Cuenca, 1936) is a Spanish sculptor, engraver, painter and designer.

Cruz Novillo began painting in his native town in 1950 and in 1958 moved to Madrid..

He designed many logos. Among them, that of the newspaper El Mundo, the version of the fist and rose used by the PSOE, radiochain COPE, Spanish post service, Endesa, Banco Pastor, Repsol, Fundación ONCE, Diario 16, Antena 3 Radio, the first logo of Antena 3 TV, El Economista, Renfe railways, Spanish police Cuerpo Nacional de Policía, Tesoro Público. He designed a series of peseta bills. He also co-authored the coat of arms and the flag of the Comunidad de Madrid, with Santiago Amón Hortelano. His studio won the contest for the new institutional identity of the Government of Spain

He also designed film posters for Barrio, Los lunes al Sol, El Sur, El Espíritu de la Colmena, Pascual Duarte, El Año de las Luces, Mamá Cumple 100 Años, Hay que matar a B., La escopeta nacional, Familia and others, mostly those produced by Elías Querejeta.

He chaired the Spanish Association of Design Professionals (Asociación Española de Profesionales del Diseño, AEPD). He is also an honor fellow of the Madrid association di_mad.

As a sculptor, he has participated in the São Paulo Art Biennial, World Fair of New York and art fairs such as FIAC (art), Basel Art, Art Cologne and since 1985 in most editions of ARCO.

Cruz Novillo has focused since the early 1990s on the development of the "Diafragma" concept. Under this concept many of his works combine a variable number of monochrome, sound, photographic or tri-dimensional elements. In 2008 he finished the "Diafragma Decafónico de Dígitos" ("Decaphonic Diaphragm of Digits") for the façade of the main building of the National Institute of Statistics of Spain, in Madrid, after its reform by Ruiz-Larrea y Asociados. This work adds sound to produce synesthesia. In ARCO'10 he presented "Diafragma dodecafónico 8.916.100.448.256, opus 14", a "chronochromophonic" work that can be played for 3,392,732 years.

En 2007, Cruz Novillo founded the studio Cruz más Cruz with his son Pepe (designer and architect).

In November 2006 he joined the Academia de Bellas Artes de San Fernando.

PSOE fist and rose logo 

In 1977, Cruz Novillo designed the new logo of the Spanish Socialist Workers' Party (PSOE), a redesign of the emblem created by Marc Bonnet for the French Socialist Party in 1969, and shared by a number of parties around the world as well as by the Socialist International. Cruz Novillo’s version was later picked up, without PSOE authorization, by the Socialist Party of Albania.
The PSOE stated that it owned copyright on the Spanish version, although it was not clear if designer Cruz Novillo also maintained rights over it.

Gallery

Logos

Bank notes

Prizes 

 Premio Nacional de Diseño (1997)
 LAUS Prize (1978)
 AEPD Prize (1993, 1995, 1996 y 2001)
 Premio Nacional de Pintura CCM (2002)
 FAD Medal (2006)
 Prize of the Society of News Design to the best designed masthead for his work for the newspaper El Economista (2006)
 Premio Castilla-La Mancha de Diseño (2008)
 Medalla de Oro al Mérito en las Bellas Artes (2012)
 Premio Gráffica (2017)

References

External links 

 Web oficial
 Diafragma dodecafónico Opus 14
 Conferencia en el Blanc Festival 2013
 Conferencia en el MAD by Domestika 2014
 Entrevista en el programa "Capitulares" de TVE
 Discurso de ingreso en la Real Academia de Bellas Artes de San Fernando, 24 mayo 2009
 

Graphic designers
21st-century Spanish painters
20th-century Spanish painters
20th-century Spanish sculptors
20th-century Spanish male artists
Spanish male sculptors
Sculptors from Castilla–La Mancha
1936 births
Living people
21st-century Spanish male artists